Abdulla Shallal (born 12 June 1993) is a Bahraini professional footballer who plays as a defender who currently plays for Riffa and Bahrain.

References

1993 births
Living people
Bahraini footballers
2015 AFC Asian Cup players
Bahrain international footballers
Sportspeople from Manama
Association football defenders